Polyarthritis is any type of arthritis that involves 5 or more joints simultaneously. It is usually associated with autoimmune conditions and may be experienced at any age and is not sex specific.

Causes
Polyarthritis is most often caused by an auto-immune disorder such as rheumatoid arthritis, amyloidosis, psoriatic arthritis, and lupus erythematosus but can also be caused by infection with an alphavirus such as chikungunya virus and Ross River virus. This condition is termed alphavirus polyarthritis syndrome. Sindbis virus, which is endemic in Northern Europe, Africa, the Middle East, and Australia, is the most widely distributed of the alphaviruses causing polyarthritis, though infection is usually mild or asymptomatic.

Associated conditions
It may be associated with bilateral edema in lower limbs, pain and joint swelling. Sometimes there is previous history of inflammatory joint problems and bilateral edema of lower limbs.

Alphavirus Polyarthritis Syndrome has an incubation period of 3–21 days, depending on the specific virus, with either a gradual or sudden onset of fever, arthralgias, headache, and lymphadenitis and conjunctivitis in some forms. A maculopapular rash may present 4–8 days post symptom onset and may be accompanied by an increase in fever. Joint pains associated with this condition may recur for many months after initial illness for up to a year.

See also
 Polyarteritis nodosa

External links 

Arthritis